Admiral Ushakov was a  of the Soviet Navy.

Development and design 

The Sverdlov-class cruisers, Soviet designation Project 68bis, were the last conventional gun cruisers built for the Soviet Navy. They were built in the 1950s and were based on Soviet, German, and Italian designs and concepts developed prior to the Second World War. They were modified to improve their sea keeping capabilities, allowing them to run at high speed in the rough waters of the North Atlantic. The basic hull was more modern and had better armor protection than the vast majority of the post Second World War gun cruiser designs built and deployed by peer nations. They also carried an extensive suite of modern radar equipment and anti-aircraft artillery. The Soviets originally planned to build 40 ships in the class, which would be supported by the s and aircraft carriers.

The Sverdlov class displaced 13,600 tons standard and 16,640 tons at full load. The hull was a completely welded new design and the ships had a double bottom for over 75% of their length. The ship also had twenty-three watertight bulkheads. The Sverdlovs had six boilers providing steam to two shaft geared steam turbines generating .

Sverdlov-class cruisers main armament included twelve /57 cal B-38 guns mounted in four triple Mk5-bis turrets. They also had twelve /56 cal Model 1934 guns in six twin SM-5-1 mounts. For anti-aircraft weaponry, the cruisers had thirty-two  anti-aircraft guns in sixteen twin mounts and were also equipped with ten  torpedo tubes in two mountings of five each.

The Sverdlovs had  belt armor and had a  armored deck. The turrets were shielded by  armor and the conning tower, by  armor.

The cruisers' ultimate radar suite included one 'Big Net' or 'Top Trough' air search radar, one 'High Sieve' or 'Low Sieve' air search radar, one 'Knife Rest' air search radar and one 'Slim Net' air search radar. For navigational radar they had one 'Don-2' or 'Neptune' model. For fire control purposes the ships were equipped with two 'Sun Visor' radars, two 'Top Bow' 152 mm gun radars and eight 'Egg Cup' gun radars. For electronic countermeasures the ships were equipped with two 'Watch Dog' ECM systems.

Construction and career
Admiral Ushakov was laid down on 29 September 1951 at Baltic Shipyard, Leningrad and launched on 31 August 1952. The vessel was commissioned on 18 August 1952. On 19 September 1953, she entered the 8th Navy. From 16 to 21 April 1954, she visited Stockholm, Sweden. In 1955, Admiral Ushakov won the prize of the Commander-in-Chief of the Navy for artillery shooting. On 24 December 1955, the cruiser transferred to the DKBF. On 3 November 1956, she was transferred to KSF. In 1957, the ship was tested to ensure take-off and landing of a helicopter on the runway.

From 19 to 22 October 1973, Admiral Ushakov visited Messina, Italy. From 7–10 August 1981, the cruiser visited Varna, Bulgaria. On 28 February 1983, the vessel was withdrawn from service and placed in reserve for the second time and mothballed in Sevastopol. On 16 September 1987, the cruiser was disarmed and removed from the Navy.

In 1992, she was sold to a private Indian firm for scrap in India.

Pennant numbers

References

External links 

 Photo gallery

1950 ships
Ships built at the Baltic Shipyard
Cold War cruisers of the Soviet Union
Sverdlov-class cruisers